Mary Lloyd may refer to:

 Mary Lloyd (Royal Navy officer)  (1902–1972), director of the Women's Royal Naval Service (WRNS)
 Mary Lloyd (sculptor), Welsh sculptor
 Mary Lloyd (abolitionist), British abolitionist
 Mary Helen Wingate Lloyd, American horticulturist
 Mary Merrall, actress who may have been born Mary Lloyd

See also
 Marie Lloyd (1870–1922),  English music hall singer, comedian and musical theatre actress
 Mary Lloyd Jones (born 1934), Welsh printmaker and artist